Minnesota State Highway 175 (MN 175) is a  state highway in northwest Minnesota, which runs from North Dakota Highway 5 (ND 5) at the North Dakota state line and continues east to its eastern terminus at its intersection with U.S. Highway 59 (US 59) near Lake Bronson.

The route passes through the city of Hallock.

Route description
MN 175 serves as an east–west route between Lake Bronson, Hallock, the Red River, and Joliette, North Dakota.

The route is also known as Broadway Street in Hallock.

The Middle Branch Two Rivers follows MN 175 throughout its route.

The route is located in the Red River Valley region.

History
MN 175 was authorized in 1963 between US 75 at Hallock and the North Dakota state line.  The MN 175/ND 5 bridge crossing the Red River at the state line was not completed until the late 1960s. The section of MN 175 between US 75 at Hallock and US 59 in Hazelton Township was authorized in 1972.

MN 175 was paved by the late 1960s between Hallock and the state line after completion of the Red River bridge crossing. The section of MN 175 between Hallock and Hazelton Township had been paved prior to becoming a state highway.

MN 175 was numbered for its association with US 75.

Major intersections

References

External links

MN 175 at the Unofficial Minnesota Highways Page

175
Transportation in Kittson County, Minnesota